Claudell may refer to:

Claudell, Kansas, U.S.
Claudell Washington (1954–2020), American baseball player

See also
Claudel, surname